Events from the year 1654 in Sweden.

Incumbents
Monarch - Christina then Charles X Gustav

Events
 April - The 1654 Anglo-Swedish alliance is forged to offset the Danish-Dutch alliance. 
 6 June - Charles X Gustav succeeds his cousin Christina on the Swedish throne. After her abdication on the same day, Christina, now the former reigning queen of a Protestant nation, secretly converts to Catholicism.
 24 October - The wedding between Charles X Gustav and Hedwig Eleonora of Holstein-Gottorp.

Births

 23 May - Nicodemus Tessin the Younger, architect (died 1728) 
 6 October - Johan Peringskiöld, antiquarian (died 1720)
 Anna Lohe, banker (died 1731)

Deaths

 25 January - Ebba Mauritzdotter Leijonhufvud, courtier (born 1595) 
 28 August - Axel Oxenstierna, politician (born 1583) 
 Louise van der Nooth, courtier (born 1630s)

References

 
Years of the 17th century in Sweden
Sweden